Benedict College is a private historically black college in Columbia, South Carolina. Founded in 1870 by northern Baptists, it was originally a teachers' college. It has since expanded to offer majors in many disciplines across the liberal arts. The campus includes buildings in the Benedict College Historic District, a historic area listed on the National Register of Historic Places.

Benedict College was founded in 1870 on land of a former  plantation in Columbia, South Carolina. Representing the American Baptist Home Mission Society, Bathsheba A. Benedict of Pawtucket, Rhode Island had provided the $13,000.00 to purchase the property. This was one of numerous educational institutions founded in the South for formerly enslaved people by northern religious mission societies, as education was seen as key to the future for African Americans.

History
Benedict Institute opened on December 12, 1870.

Benedict's first class consisted of ten freedmen; the teacher was the Reverend Timothy Dodge. He was a college-educated preacher from the North, who was also appointed as president of the institute. Classes were first held in the "Big House" of the plantation, which had been built in 1839 and deteriorated during the war. The institute's mission was prepare men and women to be "powers for good in society.” Because enslaved people had been prohibited from learning to read or write, initially classes were held at the grammar school level in such basic subjects as reading, writing, and math; other subjects included Bible and theology. Eventually, other subjects were added to the curriculum to address the original objective of the school: to train teachers and preachers.

On November 2, 1894, the institution was chartered as a four-year liberal arts college by the South Carolina legislature and its name was changed to Benedict College. In addition to funding from Baptist donors, the school received grants from the Slater Fund.

From 1870 to 1930, Benedict College was led by a succession of seven northern white Baptist ministers, all college-educated. On April 10, 1930, the Reverend John J. Starks, who earned his bachelor's degree from the college in 1891, became the first African-American president of the college. Five African-American presidents have succeeded him.

Late 20th century to present
In 1994, with a strategic planning process in place, Benedict College set an enrollment goal of "2000 by the year 2000". The goal was achieved in 1996 with an enrollment of 2,138 students. The fall 2002 enrollment was 3,000. Benedict College is engaged in an ongoing strategic planning process, which will guide the college in the 21st century.

The college is implementing a $50 million campus improvement plan, which includes land acquisition and the completion of a comprehensive athletics complex. Campus facilities improvements over the past nine years have included upgrade of residence halls by installation of air-conditioning, fire sprinkler systems, and security systems; completion of an activities field and community park; renovation of historic Antisdel Chapel, and Bacoats and Alumni halls, and restoration of historic Morgan, Pratt, and Starks halls, including the Student Leadership Development Center.

During this period, new construction has included three residence halls, a parking garage, a campus center/dining hall, an Administration Building, and a Business Development Center. Additionally, buildings were acquired to house a fitness center, and the Division of Community Development/Center for Excellence. Three apartment complexes have been purchased for student housing. As a part of the college's community development goal, it has renovated more than 50 rundown properties in the adjacent community in Columbia.

Benedict College Historic District
The Benedict College Historic District was added to the National Register of Historic Places in 1987. It encompasses five buildings constructed between 1895 and 1937: Morgan Hall (1895), Pratt Hall (1902), Duckett Hall (1925), Antisdel Chapel (1932), and Starks Center (1937).

Academics
Benedict offers 29 degrees from 12 departments.

In addition to offering traditional education, the college also offers continuing education for those "non-traditional students".

Accreditation 
Benedict College is accredited by the Commission on Colleges of the Southern Association of Colleges and Schools to award baccalaureate degrees.

The Teacher Education Program is fully approved by the South Carolina Department of Education and the Program in Social Work is accredited by the Council on Social Work Education. The Environmental Health Science Program is fully accredited by the National Environmental Health Science and Protection Accreditation Council (EHAC).

Marching Tigers "Band of Distinction"
Benedict's Marching Tigers "Band of Distinction" was founded in the 1960s under the direction of Roy McCollough.  The band performs at most football games, home basketball games, and several special events throughout the year.  The band is currently under the direction of Henry Wade Johnson.

Athletics 
Benedict athletic teams are the Tigers. The college is a member of the Division II level of the National Collegiate Athletic Association (NCAA), primarily competing in the Southern Intercollegiate Athletic Conference (SIAC) since the 1932–33 academic year. The Tigers previously competed in the Eastern Intercollegiate Athletic Conference (EIAC) of the National Association of Intercollegiate Athletics (NAIA) from 1988–89 to 2001–02 (hence it held dual membership with both the NAIA and the NCAA).

Benedict competes in 14 intercollegiate varsity sports: Men's sports include baseball, basketball, cross country, football, tennis, track & field and volleyball; while women's sports include basketball, cheerleading, cross country, softball, tennis, track & field and volleyball.

Facilities 
The college has built the Charlie W. Johnson Stadium for its football games on-campus, which opened in 2006. Basketball games are played at HRC Arena.

Accomplishments 
The Benedict Tigers tennis team won the SIAC conference championship in 2015.

In 2022, the Tigers football team put together their best season in school history, winning the SIAC championship and qualifying for the NCAA Division II playoffs for the first time. In addition, Benedict also claimed the black college national championship for schools competing below the NCAA Division I level.

Notable alumni

References

External links 

 
 Official athletics website

 
Universities and colleges affiliated with the American Baptist Churches USA
Historically black universities and colleges in the United States
Universities and colleges accredited by the Southern Association of Colleges and Schools
Baptist Christianity in South Carolina
Buildings and structures in Columbia, South Carolina
African-American history of South Carolina
Historic districts on the National Register of Historic Places in South Carolina
University and college buildings on the National Register of Historic Places in South Carolina
National Register of Historic Places in Columbia, South Carolina
1870 establishments in South Carolina
Private universities and colleges in South Carolina